is a railway station in Nerima, Tokyo, Japan, operated by the private railway operator Seibu Railway and the Tokyo subway operator Toei Subway.

Lines
Toshimaen Station is served by the Seibu Toshima Line and the Toei Ōedo Line.

Platforms

Seibu Toshima Line
The Seibu station consists of an island platform serving two terminating tracks. An additional disembarking platform originally existed opposite platform 2.

Toei Ōedo Line
The Toei station has an island platform serving two tracks.

History
The Seibu station opened on 15 October 1927, originally named . It was renamed Toshimaen on 1 March 1933. The Toei station opened on 10 December 1991.

Station numbering was introduced on all Seibu Railway lines during fiscal 2012, with Toshimaen Station becoming "SI39".

Passenger statistics
In fiscal 2013, the Seibu station was the 60th busiest on the Seibu network with an average of 13,583 passengers daily.

The passenger figures for the Seibu station in previous years are as shown below.

Surrounding area

 Toshimaen amusement park

See also
 List of railway stations in Japan

References

External links

Toshimaen Station information (Seibu Railway) 
Toshimaen Station information (Toei) 

Railway stations in Japan opened in 1927
Toei Ōedo Line
Stations of Tokyo Metropolitan Bureau of Transportation